Eli Ankou (born June 8, 1994) is a Canadian professional football defensive tackle for the Buffalo Bills of the National Football League (NFL). He played college football at UCLA. Ankou grew up in Canada and played high school football for the St. Peter Catholic High School Knights in Orleans, Ontario, but played his senior season at Red Lion Christian Academy in Bear, Delaware.

Early years
Ankou attended St. Peter Catholic High School and Red Lion Christian Academy, where he played as a strong side defensive end. He accepted a football scholarship from UCLA.

As a true freshman, he didn't appear in any games. As a sophomore, he missed most of the season with an injury. He appeared in 3 games as a backup, making one tackle.

As a junior, he appeared in all 13 games as backup, posting 5 tackles (1 for loss).

As a senior, he became a starter after Eddie Vanderdoes was lost for the season with a right knee injury. He appeared in 13 games with 11 starts, registering 47 tackles (ninth on the team), 5 tackles for loss (tied for fourth on the team). He had 7 tackles against the University of Colorado. He made 6 tackles against Stanford University. He finished his career with 38 games (19 starts), 91 tackles (8 for loss), 1.5 sacks, three passes defensed and one fumble recovery.

Professional career

Houston Texans
Ankou was signed as an undrafted free agent by the Houston Texans after the 2017 NFL Draft on May 12. He was waived by the Texans on September 2, 2017.

Jacksonville Jaguars
On September 3, 2017, Ankou was claimed off waivers by the Jacksonville Jaguars. 

In 2017, he appeared in nine games as a backup, posting 15 tackles (one for loss), 1.5 sacks and two quarterback pressures. In 2018, he appeared in two games as a backup and had four tackles. On September 1, 2019, Ankou was waived by the Jaguars and re-signed to the practice squad on September 3.

Cleveland Browns
Ankou was signed by the Cleveland Browns off the Jaguars' practice squad on October 22, 2019. Ankou appeared in 9 games with 2 starts, tallying 7 tackles (one for loss). He was waived by the Browns on September 6, 2020.

Indianapolis Colts
On September 7, 2020, Ankou was claimed off waivers by the Indianapolis Colts. He was declared inactive during the first 5 weeks of the season. He was waived on October 17.

Houston Texans (second stint)
On October 19, 2020, Ankou was claimed off waivers by the Houston Texans and placed on the exempt/commissioner permission list. On October 26, he was activated from the exempt/commissioner permission list.

Dallas Cowboys
On November 2, 2020, Ankou was traded to the Dallas Cowboys in exchange for a 7th round draft pick in the 2022 NFL Draft. He was acquired to provide depth after the release of defensive tackle Dontari Poe and to help improve a defensive line that was struggling to stop the run. He appeared in 7 games as a backup, tallying 5 tackles and one quarterback pressure. He wasn't re-signed after the season.

Atlanta Falcons
On May 17, 2021, Ankou signed with the Atlanta Falcons. He was waived on June 17, 2021.

Buffalo Bills
On June 22, 2021, Ankou signed with the Buffalo Bills. He was waived on August 15.

Atlanta Falcons (second stint)
On August 18, 2021, Ankou signed with the Atlanta Falcons. He was waived on August 31, 2021.

Pittsburgh Steelers
On October 5, 2021, Ankou was signed to the Pittsburgh Steelers practice squad. He was released on October 12.

Tennessee Titans
On October 26, 2021, Ankou was signed to the Tennessee Titans practice squad. On November 1, 2021, Ankou was released from the practice squad.

Buffalo Bills (second stint)
On November 16, 2021, Ankou was signed to the Buffalo Bills practice squad. He played in six games, recording 10 tackles and one sack. He signed with the Bills on February 7, 2022. He was released on August 30, 2022. He was re-signed to the practice squad on October 3, 2022. He signed a reserve/future contract on January 23, 2023.

Personal life
Ankou is an Ojibwe of the Dokis First Nation through his mother Nicole Bellefeuille, while his father Adolphe is originally from the West African nation of Togo.  He has been in a relationship with American racing cyclist Shayna Powless since 2013, after the couple met at UCLA: as of 2021 the couple were engaged.

References

External links
UCLA Bruins bio

1994 births
Living people
Ojibwe people
Canadian football people from Ottawa
Black Canadian players of American football
Canadian people of Togolese descent
Gridiron football people from Ontario
American football defensive tackles
UCLA Bruins football players
Houston Texans players
Jacksonville Jaguars players
Cleveland Browns players
Indianapolis Colts players
Dallas Cowboys players
Atlanta Falcons players
Buffalo Bills players
Pittsburgh Steelers players
Tennessee Titans players